Thomas Kilgore (1715–1823) was an American explorer and an American Revolutionary War veteran. Kilgore was the founder of Cross Plains, Tennessee, and the first European settler in Robertson County, Tennessee, arriving in the area in 1778.

Thomas Kilgore was born in 1715 in present-day Virginia. Kilgore served in the American Revolutionary War, and many have claimed that he fought in the Battle of Kings Mountain. However historians have disputed this claim, saying that Kilgore served as the Quartermaster for the Commission surveying the District for North Carolina Revolutionary War soldiers.

The Legislature of North Carolina passed a preemption law in the 1770s, granting 640 acres of land in western North Carolina to people 21 years old or older who settled on the land. This preemption law motivated Kilgore to claim land, and in 1778, he began his journey west with some ammunition, salt, and a few grains of corn. Kilgore used the sun and North Star as his guide, and eventually reached Bledsoe's Lick. After resting their for a few days, Kilgore traveled 25 miles west where he found a cave next to the middle fork of the Red River, which he would use as a shelter because of its protection against Native American attacks. Kilgore then used the grains of corn that he had brought with him to plant a few hills of the crop. In the fall, the corn had fully grown, so Kilgore returned to eastern North Carolina with three ears of corn and the title to his land was confirmed.

Kilgore returned to his settlement in the spring of 1779, along with a few other families, and then built a fort which would be known as Kilgore Station. Thomas Kilgore died in 1823 at the age of 108 after he became drenched and caught a chill during a trip to Gallatin, Tennessee. Kilgore was buried at Villines Cemetery in Cross Plains. In 2007, Kilgore Park, named for Thomas, opened in Cross Plains.

Notes

References

1715 births
People from Virginia
1823 deaths